Ammonium perfluorononanoate (APFN) is an anionic surfactant that in water forms liquid crystalline phases (Lyotropic liquid crystal). It is the ammonium salt of perfluorononanoic acid.

The phase diagram of APFN/H2O system is delineated by the presence of a lamellar phase and a nematic phase with awide isotropic solution. The nematic phase is of the type I, and the aggregates have a positive and diamagnetic anisotropy. In the presence of a magnetic field, the aggregates align parallel to the field direction. The change of phase at the lamellar-nematic temperature has been ascribed to order-disorder transitions.

MLV Formation
It has recently been shown that the lamellar phase of the APFN/2H2O system form multilamellar vesicles under shear rate.

Restrictions
In 2020, a California bill was passed banning APFN as an intentionally added ingredient from cosmetics.

References

Colloidal chemistry
Soft matter
Ammonium compounds
Perfluorinated compounds
Anionic surfactants